Thiruthudisaimpathy "Virundeeswarar Temple" [விருந்தீஸ்வரர்]  is located in Vadamadurai near Thudiyalur on Mettupalayam road around 10Km from Coimbatore in the State of Tamil Nadu. Earlier this place was called as Thiruthudisaimpathy, later it become as Thudiyalur. It is one of the ancient temples in the city which is more than 1300+ years old and it is one among most important Siva Temples in Coimbatore. It is believed to have been constructed by Chozha kings in the 7th century.

The Lord Shiva is [Swayambumurthy], There are actually two Lingams in the sanctorum- One Lingam [Swayambumurthy] at the back and a small Lingam in the front. The temple is facing East.

The temple is maintained and administered by the Hindu Religious and Charitable Endowments Department of Government of Tamil Nadu.

History
As per Sthala Puranam, once Sundaramurthy Nayanar was travelling in this area.  After having darshan at Avinashi, he came this side and he was very tired and hungry.  He prayed to the Lord to come to his rescue.  At that time, an elderly couple came that side and fed him sumptuous food mainly made with Drumstick leaves and fruits.  When Sundarar’s hunger was satisfied, to his surprise, he found that the couple were none other than Shri Parvathi and Parameswarar.  As the Lord offered Virundhu ( feast or food ), He is called Virundeeswarar, is the presiding deity of this temple together with his consort Parvati, who is known as "Viswanayaki".

We usually see Lord Nataraja dancing with his long hair flying wide, the Lord dances here with his hair well dressed. Lord Shiva granted his equal power to vehicle Nandhi at this temple, hence this Nandi is called "Adhikara Nandi", the concept of Adhikara Nandi is originated from this temple. As per local people, the Adhikara Nandi concept in other temples came into existence after this temple.
  
After Several years, this temple Maha-Kumbhabhishekam was held on 11-July-2019.

Events
 Every year on 17th of Panguni month, the Sun rays falls on Lord Virundeeswarar
 Maha Shivratri
 Pradosham
 Sankatahara Chaturthi
 Ganesh Chaturthi
 Thaipusam
 Kala Bhairavar Ashtami
 Arudhra Darisanam
 Hanuman Jayanti

Location
Arulmigu Virundeeswar Temple,
Mettupalayam Road, K. Vadamadurai Post [Near Thudiyalur],
Coimbatore-641017

Temple Time

 Morning: 7.00 AM to 12.00 PM
 Evening: 4.30 PM to 8.00 PM

References

Shiva temples in Coimbatore district